Moustapha Dabo (born 17 February 1986) is a Senegalese footballer, who plays for Terengganu in Malaysia Super League.11

Career
Making a promising start to his career at Urania Genève Sport, Dabo soon transferred to Sion. Unable to establish himself at Sion, he spent much of his time on loan at other clubs. After Sion, he made the move to Qatar playing briefly for Al-Sailiya and even less for Al-Ittihad Kalba in the UAE. He made a return to Switzerland signing for Yverdon-Sport in January 2011. Six months later, he moved to the league rivals FC Aarau. In July 2012 Dabo was signed by the Latvian Higher League club FK Spartaks Jūrmala. During the season, he played only 4 matches, without scoring any goals. In October 2012 Dabo was released. Emeghara was released by Gabala half way through his contract at the end of  the 2012–13 season.

Gabala
In January 2013 Dabo signed a 1-year contract with Azerbaijan Premier League team Gabala. Dabo made his debut for Gabala in 1–1 draw at home to Qarabağ on 10 February 2013. His first, and only, goal for Gabala came in his second appearance for Gabala in their 6–1 defeat away to AZAL on 3 March 2012. Dabo went on to make a total of 8 appearances in all competitions with only the one goal to his name. He was released by Gabala half way through his contract at the end of the 2012–13 season. Following his release from Gabala, Dabo signed with Kahramanmaraşspor of the TFF First League in August 2013.

Career statistics

References

External links
 Football.ch profile

1986 births
Living people
Senegalese footballers
FC Sion players
Servette FC players
FC St. Gallen players
FC Aarau players
Swiss Super League players
Expatriate footballers in Switzerland
FK Spartaks Jūrmala players
Expatriate footballers in Latvia
Association football forwards
Urania Genève Sport players
Al-Sailiya SC players
Expatriate footballers in Qatar
Footballers from Dakar
Al-Ittihad Kalba SC players
Expatriate footballers in the United Arab Emirates
Gabala FC players
Expatriate footballers in Azerbaijan
Expatriate footballers in Malaysia
Senegalese expatriate sportspeople in Malaysia
Qatar Stars League players
UAE Pro League players